The Regime: Evil Advances/Before They Were Left Behind is the second prequel novel in the Left Behind series, written by Tim LaHaye and Jerry B. Jenkins. It was released on Tuesday, November 15, 2005. This book covers more events leading up to the first novel Left Behind. It takes place from 9 years to 14 months before the Rapture.

Plot introduction
This installment in the saga continues to chart the story of the character who will become the Antichrist. It also follows the others who will become part of the Tribulation Force or the Global Community as well as showing how members of their families affect the choices each make. The narrative covers issues surrounding why characters such as Rayford Steele, Chloe Steele, and Cameron "Buck" Williams fail to believe. World events, particularly in Israel, continue apace, and Rayford and Buck are right at the heart of things.

Dynamic Romanian multimillionaire Nicolae Carpathia’s sphere of influence steadily grows as he parlays his looks, charm, charisma, and intellectual brilliance into success in business and politics. But it is uncertain if it is mere coincidence that those who oppose, offend, or even slight him suffer to the point of death.

Leon Fortunato, a self-proclaimed kingmaker, takes on his life’s challenge, coming alongside Carpathia during his most formative years.

Pan-Con Airlines captain Rayford Steele has settled into an uneasy truce with his wife while worrying that he has already ascended as far as he can in his career. But when he is tapped for consultation by the CIA and the Defense Department, his star begins to rise as well.

Irene Steele struggles to grow in her embryonic faith, careful not to offend her husband, who is uncomfortable with her level of devotion.

Cameron Williams becomes a celebrated journalist, his career skyrocketing from an Ivy League education to newspaper reporter, then columnist, then magazine feature writer.

Abdullah Ababneh, a young member of the Royal Jordanian Air Force, revels in his role as security adviser to the United States through Rayford Steele while facing the loss of his wife to a strange new religion.

Plot summary

After his horrifying trials in the wasteland, Nicolae Carpathia's influence grows in business and politics. However anyone who gets in his way tends to disappear, permanently. He hires kingmaker and soon-to-be False Prophet Leon Fortunato as a deputy and consultant. Over the course of a few years, Carpathia rises to power within the Romanian government, manipulating people and events for his own personal gain and often resorting to murder and blackmailing to achieve his goals. He often calls upon the influence of his "spirit guide" (later revealed to be Satan himself) for advice. Jonathan Stonagal begins to grow regretful with his involvement with Carpathia, fearing the young Antichrist is already out of his control.

Airline pilot Rayford Steele's home life is suffering, but gains a truce-like quality, while his wife is concerned that he has already risen as far his career will take him. Now a born-again Christian, Irene slowly begins to grow in her newfound faith, even leading her son Raymie Steele to salvation. However, Rayford and her daughter, Chloe, reject Irene's religious beliefs, and Irene is desperate to help them find Christ before it is too late.

Abdullah Ababneh, a Jordanian pilot, is shocked when his wife, Yasmine, and his two teenage children become followers of Christianity. After many heated arguments, she leaves him, taking the children with her. This later leads Abdullah to become an alcoholic and have affairs with several women, though it is clear that he is desperate for his family back in place of this destructive new lifestyle. He fears it is the work of Allah as punishment for growing lax in his Muslim faith.

Rayford, meanwhile, is considering pursuing a relationship with Hattie Durham, a young flight attendant and his co-worker. At first it seems impossible for Rayford, though he slowly begins to warm to the idea, often having dinner with her and giving her rides home. He slowly begins to contemplate taking their relationship to a whole new level.

Celebrated journalist Buck Williams becomes a feature writer for the Boston Globe, coming from an Ivy League education at Princeton University. After writing several revered pieces, Buck is hired for Global Weekly, a job that has been his dream for all his life. In Israel, he meets and interviews renowned scientist Chaim Rosenzweig, who has recently developed a formula that makes plant life grow in desert soil. Suddenly, an immense military strike against Israel commences and the entire nation stands on the brink of complete annihilation.

Characters
 Captain Rayford Steele
 Irene Steele
 Chloe Steele
 Raymie Steele
 Cameron "Buck" Williams
 Hattie Durham
 Nicolae Carpathia
 Leon Fortunato
 Viviana Ivinisova
 Reiche Planchette
 Jonathan Stonagal
 Dirk Burton
 Jeff Williams
 Mr. and Mrs. Steele, both die in this book
 Joshua Todd-Cothran
 Dizzy Rowland
 Abdullah Ababneh aka Abdullah Smith
 Chaim Rosenzweig
 Bruce Barnes
 Pastor Vernon Billings
 Steve Plank
 Stanton Bailey
 Gerald Fitzhugh, the President of the United States
 Wilma Fitzhugh, the First Lady of the United States

Release details
2005, U.S.: Tyndale House, Pub date 15 November 2005, hardback (First edition)
2005, U.S.: Tyndale House, Pub date ? November 2005, paperback 
2006, U.S.: Tyndale House, Pub date ? April 2006, paperback (Mass Market edition)

Left Behind series
2005 American novels
Prequel novels
Novels set in Boston
Novels set in Chicago
Novels set in Israel
Novels set in Jordan
Novels set in Romania